The 1993 South American Rugby Championship was the 18th edition of the competition of the leading national Rugby Union teams in South America.

For the second time, the tournament wasn't played in a host country, but in different venues in each country participating.

Argentina won the tournament.

The six matches between Argentina, Uruguay, Chile and Paraguay were also valid for the pool for 1995 Rugby World Cup qualifying.

Standings 

{| class="wikitable"
|-
!width=165|Team
!width=40|Played
!width=40|Won
!width=40|Drawn
!width=40|Lost
!width=40|For
!width=40|Against
!width=40|Difference
!width=40|Pts
|- bgcolor=#ccffcc align=center
|align=left| 
|4||4||0||0||254||23||+ 231||8
|- align=center
|align=left| 
|4||3||0||1||146||33||+ 113||6
|- align=center
|align=left| 
|4||2||0||2||80||163||- 83||4
|- align=center
|align=left| 
|4||1||0||3||72||135||- 63||2
|- align=center
|align=left| 
|4||0||0||4||55||253||- 198||0
|}

Results

References

1993
1993 rugby union tournaments for national teams
1993 in Argentine rugby union
rugby union
rugby union
rugby union
rugby union
1993 in South American rugby union